is the name of a neighborhood (a ) in Kamakura, a city located in Kanagawa, Japan, about 50 km south-south-west of Tokyo. Nishi Mikado lies north-east of Tsurugaoka Hachiman-gū.

Etymology of the name
(46 years later, after Hōjō Masako's death, the government's headquarters were transferred to a location near Wakamiya Ōji and renamed ). The compound had four gates, and the western one gave its name to the area it faced. The area east of Egara Tenjinsha, now called , used to be called Higashi Mikado, and the name is still sometimes used. Kita Mikado still exists as well but, like Higashi Mikado, it does not constitute a chō.

The Kamakurachō Seinendan stele in Nishi Mikado says:

Nishi Mikado is the area west of the Hokkedō. It was given this name because it faced the Ōkura Bakufu's western gate. In Nishi Mikado used to stand [temples called] Hōon-ji, Hojuin, Kōshō-ji, and Raikō-ji. Of them, only Raikō-ji still exists.

Points of interest 
 Tomb of Minamoto no Yoritomo
 Raikō-ji 
 The site of the Ōkura Bakufu 
 The site of Hokkedō  
 Egara Tenjinsha shrine

Notes

References 
 
 
 

Kamakura, Kanagawa